David Wright (born 1982) is an American baseball player.

David Wright may also refer to:

Diplomats
David Wright (British diplomat) (born 1944), U.K. ambassador to Japan
David Wright (Canadian diplomat) (born 1944), Canadian diplomat

Musicians
David Wright (British musician) (born 1953), British keyboard player, composer and producer
Hoss Wright, American drummer

Politicians
David McKenzie Wright (1874–1937), Canadian House of Commons member
David R. Wright (1935–2016), American politician from Pennsylvania
David Wright (politician) (born 1966), British politician
David A. Wright, American businessman and politician from South Carolina

Sports
David Wright (swimming coach) (born 1948), New Zealand swimming coach
Dave Wright (runner) (born 1951), South African ultramarathon runner
David Wright (rugby league) (born 1951), Australian rugby league footballer
David Wright (soccer) (born 1978), American soccer defender
David Wright (footballer) (born 1980), British footballer
David Wright (sailor) (born 1981), Canadian sport sailor

Writers
David McKee Wright (1869–1928), Irish-born Australian poet and journalist
David Wright (poet) (1920–1994), South African poet
David Wright (writer) (born 1964), American writer and journalist
David Wright (journalist) (born 1964), American broadcast journalist 
David Wright, television writer and 2-time Survivor contestant

Others
David McCord Wright (1909–1968), American economist and educator
David Wright (academic), professor of health and social policy
David Wright (artist) (1912–1967), British artist and illustrator
David F. Wright (1937–2008), historian
David P. Wright (born 1953), American theologian
David Wright (arranger) (born 1949), mathematics professor and barbershop arranger
David C. Wright, American businessman, former owner of Sterling Faucet

See also
Dave Wright (disambiguation)